House of Angels – Third Time Lucky is a Swedish film directed by Colin Nutley. It premiered on 25 December 2010 in Swedish cinemas. It is the third film of the Änglagård film trilogy.

Cast 
 Helena Bergström as Fanny Zander 
 Reine Brynolfsson as Henning Collmer
 Molly Nutley as Alice Zander
 Jakob Eklund as Mårten Flogfält
 Sven Wollter as Axel Flogfält
 Rikard Wolff as Zac 
 Jan Mybrand as Per-Ove Ågren
 Ing-Marie Carlsson as Eva Ågren
 Lena T Hansson as Mona
 Maria Lundqvist as Anki

References

External links

Swedish sequel films
Films directed by Colin Nutley
Swedish comedy-drama films
2010s Swedish films